Hyalobole is a genus of moths of the family Noctuidae.

Species
 Hyalobole orthosioides Warren, 1911

References
Natural History Museum Lepidoptera genus database
Hyalobole at funet

Cuculliinae